Sääre is one of the four villages on the island of Kihnu, in southwestern Estonia. Administratively it belongs to Kihnu Parish, Pärnu County. The village is situated in the northern side of the island. In 2000, Sääre had a population of 137.

Kihnu Airfield is located in Sääre.

Gallery

References

Villages in Pärnu County